The badminton men's team tournament at the 2015 Southeast Asian Games in Singapore was held from 10 June to 12 June at the Singapore Indoor Stadium, Kallang, Singapore.

Schedule
All times are Singapore Standard Time (UTC+08:00)

Results

Quarter-final

Semi-final

Final

References

External links

Men's team